Junior Noubi Fotso (born 20 June 1999) is a Gabonese professional footballer who plays as a goalkeeper for Championnat National 2 club Vannes and the Gabon national team.

International career 
Noubi Fotso made his international debut for the Gabon national team in a 3–0 friendly loss to Burkina Faso on 2 January 2022. He was selected for the 2021 Africa Cup of Nations held in Cameroon in January and February 2022.

References 

1999 births
Living people
Sportspeople from Libreville
Gabonese footballers
Association football goalkeepers
CF Mounana players
SO Cholet players
Vannes OC players
Gabon Championnat National D1 players
Championnat National 3 players
Championnat National 2 players

Gabon international footballers
2021 Africa Cup of Nations players